Barbie: Thumbelina (also known as Barbie Presents: Thumbelina) is a 2009 computer-animated fantasy film directed by Conrad Helten. It was released on March 17, 2009, and it made its television premiere on Nick Jr. UK on December 24, 2012. The fifteenth film in the Barbie film series, it is a modern retelling of Hans Christian Andersen's fairy tale Thumbelina. The film centers around Thumbelina, a "twillerbee" who befriends a human girl, and both must cooperate their strength in order to save the environment.

Official description 
"Barbie presents the story of Thumbelina in a modern retelling of the classic tale. Meet a tiny girl named Thumbelina who lives in harmony with nature in the magical world of the Twillerbees that's hidden among the wildflowers. At the whim of a spoiled young girl named Makena, Thumbelina and her two friends have their patch of wildflowers uprooted and are transported to a lavish apartment in the city. Here they learn of construction plans that threaten to destroy the land of the Twillerbees! Harnessing the magic of nature, Thumbelina sets out to prove that even the smallest person can make a big difference."

Plot
The story opens with Barbie and kindergarten students walking in a big meadow, ready to plant trees. Emma, one of the children, finds a small tree and decides to plant it, but her friends laugh at her because of it, making her sad. However, Barbie cheers her up by telling her that a small tree can grow into a very big tree, then tells her the story of Thumbelina.

Thumbelina is one of the Twillerbees, wingless fairies who spawn from flowers and whose magic affects plant growth. Learning that some Twillerbuds are growing and will soon open to reveal new Twillerbabies, Thumbelina constructs false wing gliders for herself and her friends Janessa and Chrysella, so they can monitor the Twillerbud flowers until the babies are "born".

Tractors arrive in the field and remove part of the flowerbed, with the three friends hiding inside. The plants, now potted, are placed in an apartment belonging to the parents of a spoiled, wealthy girl named Makena; she keeps the flowers in her bedroom. As Thumbelina, Chrysella, and Janessa search for a way to go back to their field, Makena's dog Poofles runs after them. Makena comes into the bedroom while the trio hides. Makena talks to her friend Violet on a cell phone about her parents, who intend to build a factory on the Twillerbees' field. An upset Thumbelina reveals herself and scolds Makena; Makena, surprised, sees the ownership of a Twillerbee as a way to one-up Violet, whom she always competes with.

The three Twillerbees try, unsuccessfully, to escape from Makena and Poofles. Finally, Thumbelina is able to send Chrysella and Janessa home, to disturb the work in the field while Thumbelina talks to Makena. Thumbelina makes Makena promise not to tell anyone about her, and to persuade her parents to stop building the factory. In return, Thumbelina agrees to create special plants for Makena.

Makena, determined to show off in front of her friends, agrees to the deal but only perfunctorily talks to her parents about the factory project. She also breaks her promise and brings Violet and another girl named Ashlyn to show off Thumbelina and her powers. Thumbelina angrily leaves, and Makena realizes that the other two badly-behaved girls are not her true friends. Missing Thumbelina's companionship, Makena goes to the field and begs forgiveness. Thumbelina reveals the rest of the Twillerbees, and the Twillerbuds, to Makena, who becomes determined to save them.

That night, Makena, Thumbelina, Janessa, Chrysella, Poofles, and Lola the bird all work hard in a greenhouse to grow the plants. The next day, Makena shows her parents the result and asks them to stop the building. Thumbelina appears, and explains to the adults about the Twillerbuds that will bloom soon. Evan and Vanessa, Makena's parents, are convinced, and agree to stop Myron, the contractor, from destroying the field.

Thanks to some birds and the other Twillerbees, Myron's workers are tricked into believing the field is haunted, and flee. However, Myron is angry and determined to finish his work, as he is allergic to flowers and wants them gone. Ultimately, Makena and Thumbelina arrive and halt Myron long enough for Evan and Vanessa to arrive at the field and have the factory project shut down. A team of birds chases Myron away, and Makena and her family watch the Twillerbuds bloom. To prevent others from destroying the field, they turn the field into a Reserved Park.

As Barbie finishes the story, an adult Makena arrives and reveals they are in the Reserved Park, which now belongs to her. Barbie says that even the smallest person can make a big difference; Makena is small, compared to the other adults, just like the children.

Voice cast

See also 

 Barbie (media franchise)
 Barbie: Fairytopia
 Barbie: A Fairy Secret

References

External links

2009 direct-to-video films
2009 computer-animated films
Films set in the 21st century
American direct-to-video films
Canadian direct-to-video films
Canadian independent films
2000s American animated films
Canadian animated feature films
2000s English-language films
Universal Pictures direct-to-video animated films
Universal Pictures direct-to-video films
Thumbelina
2009 fantasy films
Films based on Thumbelina
Canadian animated fantasy films
American children's animated fantasy films
Films set in the United States
Environmental films
2009 films
Films set in the 2000s
2000s Canadian films